Dùn Meadhonach is a hillfort located on the Inner Hebridean island of Colonsay, Scotland.

The fort overlooks Port Mòr and the village of Lower Kilchattan.

Citations

External links

Archaeological sites in the Southern Inner Hebrides
Hill forts in Scotland
Colonsay
Former populated places in Scotland